Steve Walker (born January 12, 1973) is a Canadian ice hockey coach and former professional ice hockey player. He is currently serving as head coach of EC KAC in Austria.

Playing career 
Born in Collingwood, Ontario, Walker played junior hockey for the Stayner Siskins, Owen Sound Platers and the Barrie Colts before turning pro in 1993, playing nine games for the ECHL's Wheeling Thunderbirds. Walker then spent two seasons in the Colonial Hockey League with the Muskegon Fury, scoring 43 goals and 57 assists for 100 points in the 1995-96 season. He split the 1996-97 season in the Colonial Hockey League with the Flint Generals, the American Hockey League for the Rochester Americans and the International Hockey League with the Detroit Vipers where he would spend another three seasons.

In 2000, Walker joined Eisbären Berlin, a member of the Deutsche Eishockey Liga in Germany and remained with the team until 2011. He made 593 DEL appearances for the Eisbären team, tallying 213 goals and 379 assists. He captured five German championship titles with Berlin and had his jersey retired on December 26, 2014.

Coaching career
From January 2013 to 2015, he served as head coach of the Stayner Siskins, a member of the Georgian Mid-Ontario Junior C Hockey League.

On August 5, 2015, Walker was appointed as assistant coach of German club Adler Mannheim. He ended his two-year tenure in 2017 and took over the head coaching job at EC KAC in the Austrian Hockey League.

Career statistics

References

External links

https://ca.linkedin.com/in/steven-walker-64b38198

1973 births
Barrie Colts players
Canadian ice hockey left wingers
Detroit Vipers players
Eisbären Berlin players
Flint Generals players
Ice hockey people from Ontario
Living people
Muskegon Fury players
Owen Sound Platers players
Rochester Americans players
Wheeling Thunderbirds players
Canadian ice hockey coaches
Canadian expatriate ice hockey players in Germany